Viacheslav Alexandrovich "Slava" Fetisov (born 20 April 1958) is a Russian former professional ice hockey defenceman. He played for HC CSKA Moscow for 13 seasons before joining the National Hockey League (NHL), where he played with the New Jersey Devils and Detroit Red Wings. With the Wings, he won back-to-back Stanley Cups and was part of the team's Russian Five unit. After retiring from his playing career, he became the assistant coach for the New Jersey Devils. Having a very successful four years, he helped get the team to two Stanley Cup finals and one Stanley Cup victory. In addition to that, he won two Olympic gold medals and seven world championships. His Stanley Cup wins, Olympic gold medals, and World Championship wins make him a member of his sport's prestigious Triple Gold Club.

Fetisov was instrumental in breaking the barrier that had prevented Soviet players from leaving the Soviet Union to join the NHL. His actions not only resulted in a number of top Soviet players joining the NHL, but encouraged many of the best players from all over Europe to go to North America.  Internationally, he was a long-time captain for the Soviet Union national team and is a two-time Olympic champion. In 2002, Fetisov led the Russian Ice Hockey Olympic team as GM and Head Coach, attaining a bronze medal. Considered one of the best defencemen of all time, he was voted as one of six players to the International Ice Hockey Federation's (IIHF) Centennial All-Star Team.

After retiring as a coach, Fetisov embarked on a political and executive career. After the 2002 Winter Olympics, Russian President Vladimir Putin offered him the position as Minister of Sport, a post he held until 2008. He is a member of the upper house of the Federal Assembly of Russia, the Federation Council representing Primorsky Krai, the founder and chairman of the KHL's Board of Directors and chair of the World Anti-Doping Agency (WADA) Athletes Committee. Fetisov was president of Russian ice hockey club HC CSKA Moscow of the Kontinental Hockey League (KHL). He was also the key member of the bidding committee that presented the Sochi 2014 proposal to the IOC in Guatemala in 2007, when a city was being chosen to host the 2014 Winter Olympics.

Playing career

CSKA Moscow (1976–89)
Fetisov debuted for CSKA Moscow's junior team at sixteen years old.  He joined the senior team in the Soviet Championship League in 1978–79 and recorded 29 points in 29 games as a rookie.  In his fourth season, Fetisov reeled off 41 points in 46 games to be named the 1982 USSR Player of the Year.  Four seasons later, he won his second Player of the Year recognition after a 34-point season in 1985–86.

NHL career (1989–98)
Fetisov soon expressed a desire to play in the NHL and submitted a request to Soviet officials. However, Soviet players defecting to North America was strictly discouraged at the time and his request was met with great resistance. Fetisov has recalled the Soviet Minister of Defence, Marshal Dmitry Yazov, giving him an ultimatum at the time to either apologize or be sent to Siberia.  Nevertheless, at the age of 31, helped by the Soviets' newfound glasnost policy, Fetisov led a group of eight Soviet players, including Helmut Balderis, Vladimir Krutov, Igor Larionov, Sergei Makarov, Sergei Mylnikov, Sergei Priakin and Sergei Starikov, into the NHL. Soviet hockey officials agreed to allow Soviet players to play in the NHL as long as they continued to compete internationally for the Soviet Union.

Fetisov had been drafted by the Montreal Canadiens in the 1978 NHL Entry Draft eleven years prior.  However, unable to play in North America at the time, he was re-entered into the 1983 NHL Entry Draft, where he was selected by the New Jersey Devils.  Fetisov debuted with the Devils in 1989–90 and recorded eight goals and 42 points, both NHL career-highs for Fetisov.

He played in New Jersey until 1994–95, when he was traded to the Detroit Red Wings in April 1995. Fetisov began producing immediately with the Red Wings, scoring 14 points in 14 games to finish the season after the trade.  He helped the Red Wings to the  1995 Stanley Cup Finals, where they were defeated by his former team, the Devils.  The following season, Fetisov matched his career high in points with 42-points in 1995–96.  He was named to his first NHL All-Star Game in 1997, then won back-to-back Stanley Cups with Detroit in 1997 and 1998, before announcing his retirement.  He took the Stanley Cup to Moscow after the 1997 championship, where the trophy appeared for the first time in Russia.

One-game return (2009)
Nearly eleven years after his retirement, Fetisov came out of retirement at the age of 51 to play for CSKA Moscow in a one-game return on 11 December 2009.  Head coach Sergei Nemchinov turned to Fetisov, president of the club, in need of a replacement for injured defenceman Denis Kulyash.  CSKA Moscow lost the game 3–2 to SKA St. Petersburg.

International play
On the international stage, Fetisov is one of the most decorated players ever.  As a junior, Fetisov competed for the Soviet Union at the European Junior Championships, where he won Top Defenceman honors during the 1975–76 season, en route to two consecutive gold medals at the tournament.  He then helped the Soviets to three consecutive gold medals at the World Junior Championships from 1976 to 1978, taking back-to-back Top Defenceman honors in 1977 and 1978.

With the Soviet national team, Fetisov won two gold medals (1984, 1988) and one silver medal (1980) at the Olympics. At the World Championships, Fetisov won seven golds (1978, 1981, 1982, 1983, 1986, 1989, 1990), one silver (1987), and three bronzes (1977, 1985, 1991). Fetisov also won one Canada Cup in 1981. At the 2002 Olympics, he was head coach of the Russian national team, winning the bronze. Fetisov and teammate Igor Larionov, along with Scott Niedermayer, Corey Perry, Joe Sakic, Patrice Bergeron, Sidney Crosby, and Jonathan Toews are the only players to win the "Grand Slam of Ice Hockey", winning the Stanley Cup, World Ice Hockey Champions, Ice Hockey at the Winter Olympics, World Ice Hockey Junior Championship, and Canada/World Cup Championship.

Coaching career
Fetisov became an assistant coach with the New Jersey Devils following his playing career and won the Stanley Cup with the club in 2000 during his three-year tenure (1998–2001).

Executive career
Following his tenure as assistant coach with the New Jersey Devils, Fetisov was named general manager of the Russian national team for the 2002 Winter Olympics in Salt Lake City, where Russia won bronze. He was succeeded as general manager by Pavel Bure for the 2006 Winter Olympics in Turin.

On 29 March 2005 Fetisov joined the World Anti-Doping Agency's Athlete Committee as its inaugural chairman.

In 2009, he became president of HC CSKA Moscow. Following the injuries of CSKA's several key defenders, Fetisov, aged 51 at the time, came out of retirement to play against SKA St Petersburg in a one-off return.

Fetisov attended the World Hockey Summit in 2010, and discussed wanting to improve KHL's relationship with the National Hockey League (NHL) with respect to transfer agreements and player contracts. The Russian league sought greater financial compensation when its players departed for the NHL, instead of negotiating a flat rate for an unlimited number of transfers.

Honors

In his home country, Fetisov has been awarded the Order of the Red Banner of Labour in 1984, the Order of Lenin in 1988, the Order Of Service To The Fatherland 4th class in 2000 and 3rd class 2005, the Order Of Honour in 1998, the Order of Friendship in 2007, and two Orders of the Badge of Honor.  On October 22, 1981, Russian astronomer Nikolai Chernykh discovered a main-belt asteroid from the Crimean Astrophysical Observatory. The asteroid was named the 8806 Fetisov after Fetisov.

In North America, Fetisov was elected to the Hockey Hall of Fame on 12 November 2001 along with Mike Gartner, Dale Hawerchuk and Jari Kurri. Internationally, he has been recognized by the IIHF in the International Centennial All-Star Team.  He received the most votes out of all players in a poll conducted by a group of 56 experts from 16 countries (54 of which voted for Fetisov) to assemble the historic squad.

Personal life
He has a daughter, Anastasia, who appeared with him in the 30 for 30 film "Of Miracles and Men."

In June 1985, Fetisov was involved in a car accident that killed his younger brother Anatoly, who was 18 years old at the time and a prospect within the HC CSKA Moscow system.

Twelve years later, following a private party on 13 June 1997 Fetisov, along with teammate Vladimir Konstantinov and team masseur Sergei Mnatsakanov, hired a limousine to drive them home after celebrating the Detroit Red Wings' Stanley Cup triumph. The driver, Richard Gnida, whose license was suspended at the time for drunk driving, lost control of the limousine and hit a tree on the median of Woodward Avenue, in Birmingham, Michigan, a suburb north of Detroit. Konstantinov spent several weeks in a coma before finally pulling through. He also suffered from serious head injuries and paralysis, while Fetisov escaped with relatively minor injuries and was able to play the following season. Mnatsakanov sustained heavy head injuries and also spent some time in a coma. The driver was charged and convicted.

In 2023, he expressed outrage at continued suspension of Russian athletes due to the 2022 Russian invasion of Ukraine:

Career statistics

Regular season and playoffs

International

Honours and awards
 Order of Merit for the Fatherland;
 3rd class (4 November 2005) – for outstanding contribution to the development of physical culture and sport, the successful performance of the Russian national team at the XXVIII Olympiad in Athens in 2004
 4th class (25 August 2000) – for his great personal contribution to the development of Russian hockey
 Order of Honour (23 August 1998) – for outstanding contribution to the development of national sport
 Order of Friendship (6 August 2007) – for active participation in efforts to ensure the victory of the application of Sochi to host the XXII Winter Olympics and XI Paralympics in 2014
 Order of Lenin (1988)
 Order of the Red Banner of Labour (1984)
 Order of the Badge of Honour, twice (1978, 1981)
 Honoured Worker of Physical Culture, Russia (16 April 2008) – for services in the development of physical culture and sports
 Silver Olympic Order (IOC)
 Honored Master of Sports (1978)
 Badge "For Services to the Moscow region"
 Stanley Cup (1997, 1998)
 UNESCO Champion for Sport
 "Russian Diamond" (2007) – for his services and achievements in sport

Movies 
Fetisov was the main focus of the 2014 documentary movie Red Army, among other influential Soviet players.

References

External links

 
 Fetisov at Hockey CCCP International
 NHL great Slava Fetisov returns to action at age of 51

1958 births
Living people
Detroit Red Wings players
HC CSKA Moscow players
HC Spartak Moscow players
Hockey Hall of Fame inductees
Ice hockey people from Moscow
Ice hockey players at the 1980 Winter Olympics
Ice hockey players at the 1984 Winter Olympics
Ice hockey players at the 1988 Winter Olympics
World Anti-Doping Agency members
IIHF Hall of Fame inductees
Medalists at the 1984 Winter Olympics
Montreal Canadiens draft picks
National Hockey League All-Stars
New Jersey Devils coaches
New Jersey Devils draft picks
New Jersey Devils players
Olympic gold medalists for the Soviet Union
Olympic ice hockey players of the Soviet Union
Olympic medalists in ice hockey
Olympic silver medalists for the Soviet Union
Recipients of the Olympic Order
Recipients of the Order of Honour (Russia)
Recipients of the Order of Lenin
Recipients of the Order "For Merit to the Fatherland", 3rd class
Russia men's national ice hockey team coaches
Russian ice hockey coaches
Russian ice hockey defencemen
Expatriate ice hockey players in the United States
Soviet ice hockey defencemen
Stanley Cup champions
Triple Gold Club
Utica Devils players
Medalists at the 1988 Winter Olympics
Medalists at the 1980 Winter Olympics
United Russia politicians
21st-century Russian politicians
Russian sportsperson-politicians
Seventh convocation members of the State Duma (Russian Federation)
Eighth convocation members of the State Duma (Russian Federation)
Members of the Federation Council of Russia (after 2000)
1st class Active State Councillors of the Russian Federation
Russian expatriate sportspeople in the United States
Soviet expatriate sportspeople in the United States
Russian expatriate ice hockey people
Soviet expatriate ice hockey players